Davor Bajsić (born 4 January 1974) is a retired Croatian football midfielder and later manager.

References

1974 births
Living people
Footballers from Osijek
Association football midfielders
Croatian footballers
NK Osijek players
HNK Cibalia players
NK Slaven Belupo players
Hapoel Rishon LeZion F.C. players
NK Kamen Ingrad players
NK Zadar players
NK Grafičar Vodovod players
Sydney United 58 FC players
Croatian Football League players
Israeli Premier League players
First Football League (Croatia) players
Croatian expatriate footballers
Expatriate footballers in Israel
Croatian expatriate sportspeople in Israel
Expatriate soccer players in Australia
Croatian expatriate sportspeople in Australia
Croatian football managers
Sydney United 58 FC managers
Croatian expatriate football managers
Expatriate soccer managers in Australia